Cosmic latte is the average color of the universe, found by a team of astronomers from Johns Hopkins University (JHU). In 2002, Karl Glazebrook and Ivan Baldry determined that the average color of the universe was a greenish white, but they soon corrected their analysis in a 2003 paper in which they reported that their survey of the light from over 200,000 galaxies averaged to a slightly beigeish white. The hex triplet value for cosmic latte is #FFF8E7.

Discovery of the color

Finding the average color of the universe was not the focus of the study. Rather, the study examined spectral analysis of different galaxies to study star formation. Like Fraunhofer lines, the dark lines displayed in the study's spectral ranges display older and younger stars and allow Glazebrook and Baldry to determine the age of different galaxies and star systems. What the study revealed is that the overwhelming majority of stars formed about 5 billion years ago. Because these stars would have been "brighter" in the past, the color of the universe changes over time, shifting from blue to red as more blue stars change to yellow and eventually red giants.

As light from distant galaxies reaches the Earth, the average "color of the universe" (as seen from Earth) tends towards pure white, due to the light coming from the stars when they were much younger and bluer.

Naming the color

The corrected color was initially published on the Johns Hopkins News website and updated on the team's initial announcement. Multiple news outlets, including NPR and BBC, displayed the color in stories and some relayed the request by Glazebrook on the announcement asking for suggestions for names, jokingly adding all were welcome as long as they were not "beige".

These were the results of a vote of the JHU astronomers involved based on the new color:

Though Drum's suggestion of "cappuccino cosmico" received the most votes, the researchers favored Drum's other suggestion, "cosmic latte". "" means "milk" in Italian, Galileo's native language, and the similar "" means "milky", similar to the Italian term for the Milky Way, "". They enjoyed the fact that the color would be similar to the Milky Way's average color as well, as it is part of the sum of the universe. They also claimed to be "caffeine biased".

See also

References

External links

 Official project website: 
 

Color
Physical cosmology
Shades of white

de:Kosmisch-Latte